Naisten Korisliiga (Women's Basketball League) is the highest tier of women's basketball in Finland. The competition was formerly known as Koripallon naisten SM-sarja (Women's Basketball Finnish Championship) and was renamed Naisten Korisliiga for the 2013-14 season.

History

Women's Finnish Championship was first introduced in 1944. The first championship was won by Helsingin Tarmo. In the 1940s, the league had six teams and the title was awarded after the regular season. In 1953 the number of teams was raised to ten. Postseason playoffs were first played in the 1973-74 season, with Nokian Urheilijat emerging victorious after defeating first Tapiolan Honka (2-1) in the Semifinals and then Työväen Mailapojat (2-1) in the Finals.

For the 2014-15 season, the league has 10 teams and each team plays each other three times in the regular season, resulting in 27 games per team. The top 8 teams continue to postseason playoffs which are played in Best-of-five format. The team placed last after the regular season is relegated to Naisten I Divisioona (English: Women's First Division).

Lea Hakala could be seen as the most influential player so far in the history of Naisten Korisliiga. Hakala played 25 seasons in the league and currently leads the record for career points. She has won the championship title for record-breaking 15 times and she has also been awarded the Player of the Year Award for 4 times.

Current teams

Teams competing in the 2019–20 Naisten Korisliiga season:
 Catz Lappeenranta, Lappeenranta
 Espoo Basket Team (EBT), Espoo
 Forssan Alku (FoA), Forssa
 HBA-Marsky, Helsinki
 Hyvinkään Ponteva (HyPo), Hyvinkää
 Kouvottaret, Kouvola
 Peli-Karhut (PeKa), Kotka
 Tapiolan Honka, Espoo
 Torpan Pojat (ToPo), Helsinki
 Vimpelin Veto (ViVe), Vimpeli

Recent champions

List of champions

Records

Career
At least 100 or more games played in the league
 Most points: 11563
  Lea Hakala
 Highest points per game average: 19.23
  Heli Roukanoja
 Most assists: 1179
  Kenya Robinson
 Highest assists per game average: 3.26
  Reetta Piipari
 Most rebounds: 6578
  Kenya Robinson
 Highest rebounds per game average: 12.46
  Kenya Robinson
 Highest efficiency: 12294
  Kenya Robinson
 Highest efficiency per game average: 31.15
  Anna Hollos

Season
Has played in at least 50% of the season's games
 Most points: 911
  Melissa Jeltema (Tapiolan Honka), 2012–13
 Highest points per game average: 26.47
  Medina Turner (Äänekosken Huima), 1996–97
 Most assists: 172
  Reetta Piipari (Peli-Karhut), 2013–14
 Highest assists per game average: 6.15
  Nikki Speed, (HoNsU), 2013–14
 Most rebounds: 575
  Shauna Tubbs (Äänekosken Huima), 1997–98
 Highest rebounds per game average: 17.14
  Sarah Zawodny (Forssan Alku), 2002–03
 Highest efficiency: 1290
  Keisha Johnson (Tampereen Pyrintö), 1994–95
 Highest efficiency per game average: 36.95
  Jennie Hall (Nokian Urheilijat), 1983–84

Match
 Most points: 53
  Nina Pajanti-Raudus (Forssan Alku), vs. Peli-Karhut (121-82), 10-21-1995
 Most assists: 16
  Erja Laaksonen (HNMKY), vs. Tapiolan Honka, (83-73), 10-24-1999
 Most rebounds: 32
  Oberon Pitterson (Tampereen Pyrintö), vs. Äänekosken Huima (78-58), 10-12-1996
 Highest efficiency: 67
  Oberon Pitterson (Tampereen Pyrintö), vs. Äänekosken Huima (78-58), 10-12-1996

All records include both regular season and playoffs. Updated as of season 2013-14

References

External links
Official website

Finland
Basketball leagues in Finland
Sports leagues established in 1944
Professional sports leagues in Finland
Women's sports leagues in Finland